Waldo Samuel "Tip" Tippin (February 25, 1900 – June 16, 1985) was an American football and basketball player, coach, and college athletics administrator.  He served as the head football coach at Allegheny College from 1932 to 1934 and at Clarion State College, now Clarion University of Pennsylvania, from 1935 to 1947 and from 1952 to 1956, compiling a career college football record of 56–63–5.  Tippin was also the head basketball coach at Allegheny for three seasons, from 1932 to 1935, tallying a mark of 12–29.  He served as the athletic director at Clarion from 1935 to 1966.  Tippin died at his home near Clarion, Pennsylvania on June 16, 1985.

Coaching career
Tippin was the head football coach at Allegheny College in Meadville, Pennsylvania.  He held that position for three seasons, from 1932 until 1934.  His coaching record at Allegheny was 3–14–2.

References

External links
 

1900 births
1985 deaths
American football ends
Allegheny Gators football coaches
Allegheny Gators men's basketball coaches
Basketball players from Kansas
American men's basketball players
Basketball coaches from Kansas
Clarion Golden Eagles athletic directors
Clarion Golden Eagles football coaches
Geneva Golden Tornadoes football players
Geneva Golden Tornadoes men's basketball players
High school football coaches in Pennsylvania
Kansas State Wildcats football players
Kansas State Wildcats men's basketball players
People from Clay County, Kansas
Coaches of American football from Kansas
Players of American football from Kansas